Live with the University of Colorado Symphony Orchestra is a 2018 live album by Indigo Girls and the University of Colorado Symphony Orchestra. The folk duo began experimenting with more complicated arrangements of their existing catalogue in 2012 and were invited to record with the orchestra in 2017.

Critical reception
Thom Jurek of AllMusic gave the album a positive review, praising it for being "not only unpolished, it's downright raw, crackling"; the editorial staff of the site gave it 3.5 out of five stars. Kelly McCartney of Folk Alley also gave a positive review, finishing, "it an absolute exception to the rule of live records rarely capturing the magic in a room. Magic was, indeed, captured." Hal Horowitz of Creative Loafing gave the release four out of five stars, with the verdict "The Indigo Girls revisit, refresh, and revive their catalog by challenging their fans to join them in breaking new ground".

Track listing
"Woodsong" – 4:33
"Sugar Tongue" – 3:46
"Able to Sing" – 4:24
"Compromise" – 3:10
"Virginia Woolf" – 5:35
"Happy in the Sorrow Key" – 2:57
"Power of Two" – 5:44
"Yoke" – 5:02
"Love of Our Lives" – 3:55
"World Falls" – 3:51
"Galileo" – 4:56
"Chickenman" – 7:45
"Fugitive" – 5:17
"Come a Long Way" – 4:02
"War Rugs" – 3:50
"Mystery" – 4:30
"Damo" – 4:49
"Come On Home" – 5:04
"Kid Fears" – 4:38
"Ghost" – 6:09
"Go" – 4:10
"Closer to Fine" – 5:59

Personnel
Indigo Girls
Amy Ray – guitar, vocals
Emily Saliers – guitar, vocals

University of Colorado Symphony Orchestra
Jenna Allen – percussion
Priscilla Arasaki – violin
Brett Armstrong – double bass
Roberto Arundale – cello
Dante Ascarrunz – double bass
Tyler Bentley – trombone
Ben Bresler – percussion
Magee Capsouto – violin
Jessica Chen – violin
Michelle Chen – bassoon
Dakota Cotugno – cello
Kamila Dotta – cello
Jacob Eichhorn – clarinet
Sarah Elert – violin
Jessica Erbe – trumpet
Matthew Farquharson – violin
Ida Findiku – violin
Jesse Fischer – double bass
Joey Fischer – viola
Ryan Foley – violin
Jason Friedman – horn
Jonathan Galle – violin
Charlie Goodman – trombone
Leanne Hampton – flute
Grace Harper – violin
Eric Haugen – cello
Kathryn Hendrickson – flute
Lindey Hoak – violin
Conner Hollingsworth – double bass
Esther Hou – violin
Megan Hurley – horn
Ryan Jacobsen – violin
Parker James – timpani
Aaron Jensen – trumpet
Avery Johnson – cello
Evan Johnson – trombone
Andrew Keeve – viola
David Leech – clarinet
José León – trombone
Gary Lewis – conductor
Dragana Loncar – viola
Charles Lovell – percussion
Lea Mattson – violin
Breana McCullough – viola
Jordan Miller – horn
David Nester – bassoon
Codi Ng – viola
Brandon Norton – trumpet
Ava Pacheco – violin
Elizabeth Potter – violin
Jordan Pyle – oboe
Cort Roberts – horn
Crystal Schneckenburger – violin
Haley Slaugh – cello
Will Spengler – cello
Alice Sprinkle – viola
Allyson Stibbards – viola
Caitlin Stokes – violin
Michiko Theurer – violin
Karen Van Acker – violin
Tracy Viator – violin
Kristin Weber – oboe
Sophia Wonneberger – viola
Tom Yaron – violin
Stephanie Yu – violin

Technical personnel
Evan Carter – photography
Mark Chalecki – mastering
Tom Heinisch – engineering
Ben Holst – engineering
Aron Michalski – crew
Denise Plumb – package design
Mike Rose – crew, engineering
Trina Shoemaker – mixing, production
Blair Woods – crew

References

External links

Press release from Rounder
Announcement from the university

2018 live albums
Indigo Girls live albums
Rounder Records live albums
Albums produced by Trina Shoemaker
Collaborative albums